The Livingston Library in New York City is one of relatively few large libraries of Freemasonry materials.

See also
National Heritage Museum (Lexington, Massachusetts)
Iowa Masonic Library and Museum

External links
 Chancellor Robert R Livingston Masonic Library of Grand Lodge - official site

Libraries in Manhattan
Masonic buildings in New York (state)
Freemasonry in the United States